Cheiracanthium insulare is a spider species found in Madagascar and Réunion.

See also 
 List of spiders of Madagascar

References

External links 

insulare
Spiders of Africa
Spiders of Madagascar
Spiders of Réunion
Spiders described in 1863